Stephen Morse Wheeler (August 30, 1900 – March 7, 1967) was a justice of the New Hampshire Supreme Court from 1957 to 1967.

Born in Atkinson, New Hampshire, Wheeler served in the United States Army in World War I, and was elected to the New Hampshire House of Representatives from his home town in 1923, making him at the time the youngest person to be elected to the New Hampshire state legislature. He received his law degree from the Northeastern University School of Law in 1927, gaining admission to the bar in New Hampshire in 1928. Wheeler served as county solicitor of Rockingham County, New Hampshire, from 1937 to 1942, and was Attorney General of New Hampshire from 1942 to 1944. He served on the New Hampshire Superior Court until March 15, 1957, when Governor Lane Dwinell appointed Wheeler to the state supreme court.

Wheeler was married to Marion Taylor, with whom he had two sons. Wheeler died from a heart attack while shoveling snow outside his home in Exeter, New Hampshire, at the age of 66.

References

1900 births
1967 deaths
United States Army personnel of World War I
Members of the New Hampshire House of Representatives
Northeastern University School of Law alumni
New Hampshire Attorneys General
Justices of the New Hampshire Supreme Court
People from Atkinson, New Hampshire